Charlotte Garrigue Masaryk (née Garrigue; 20 November 1850 – 13 May 1923) was the American-born wife of the Czechoslovak philosopher, sociologist, and politician, Tomáš Garrigue Masaryk, the first President of Czechoslovakia.

Background
Garrigue was born in Brooklyn to a Unitarian family with Huguenot ancestry on her father's side and Mayflower passengers on her mother's. She was a niece of Henry Jacques Garrigues and a great-granddaughter of Christian Vilhelm Duntzfelt.

Career
In 1877, visiting a friend studying at a conservatory in Leipzig, Germany, she first met her future husband, Tomáš Masaryk, who was staying there after having earned his doctorate at the University of Vienna. They married a year later in the United States, after which they settled in Vienna. After the wedding, her husband added her surname into his name, thus becoming Tomáš Garrigue Masaryk, as he is remembered in the Czech Republic and Slovakia (or often by the abbreviation TGM). In 1881, the Masaryks moved to Prague, where Tomáš obtained a professorship at the University of Prague.

In the era before the First World War, Mrs. Masaryk became involved in many social, humanitarian, and cultural activities of Prague society. She joined the Social Democratic Party; however, she (in agreement with her husband) rejected the Marxist doctrine of the class struggle. For Garrigue, ‘the woman question’ was part of ‘the social question.’ Together with Karla Máchová, she organized a lecture series for women on socialism and advocated equality for women.

After the outbreak of the First World War, her husband left for exile with their daughter Olga to seek international support for the independence of the nations of the Austrian-Hungarian monarchy, notably the Czechs and Slovaks. For the majority of the war, Mrs. Masaryk was under police supervision, while daughter Alice was even under arrest. The situation became even worse when son Herbert died of typhus in 1915.  All of these hardships caused Charlotte Masaryk to suffer from depression and cardiac problems.

In December 1918, Tomáš Garrigue Masaryk returned to Prague as the President of Czechoslovakia. The family began living at the Prague Castle, often spending time at the chateau of Lány.

Personal life and death

Garrigue married Tomáš Garrigue Masaryk, future president of a newly independent Czechoslovakia. Of the couple's five children, four reached adulthood - Alice, Herbert, Olga, and Jan, who later became a noted Czechoslovak diplomat and politician (Foreign Minister).

Mrs. Masaryk died in 1923, her husband in 1937. They are buried in a plot at Lány cemetery, where later also the remains of their children Jan and Alice were laid to rest.

References

1850 births
1923 deaths
American emigrants to Austria-Hungary
American Unitarians
American people of English descent
American people of French descent
Czech people of American descent
Czech people of English descent
Czech people of French descent
Czech Unitarians
Politicians from Brooklyn
American socialist feminists
Unitarian socialists
Czech socialist feminists